Psydrinae is a subfamily of beetles in the family Carabidae.

Genera
These 34 genera belong to the subfamily Psydrinae:

Tribe Gehringiini Darlington, 1933
 Afrogehringia Baehr; Schüle & Lorenz, 2009
 Gehringia Darlington, 1933
 Helenaea Schatzmayr & Koch, 1934
Tribe Moriomorphini Sloane, 1890
 Amblytelus Erichson, 1842
 Celanida Laporte, 1867
 Dystrichothorax Blackburn, 1892
 Epelyx Blackburn, 1892
 Mecyclothorax Sharp, 1903
 Melisodera Westwood, 1835
 Meonis Laporte, 1867
 Molopsida White, 1846
 Moriodema Laporte, 1867
 Moriomorpha Laporte, 1867
 Neonomius B.Moore, 1963
 Paratrichothorax Baehr, 2004
 Pharetis Liebherr, 2020
 Pseudamblytelus Baehr, 2004
 Pterogmus Sloane, 1920
 Raphetis B.Moore, 1963
 Rhaebolestes Sloane, 1903
 Rossjoycea Liebherr, 2011
 Selenochilus Chaudoir, 1878
 Sitaphe B.Moore, 1963
 Spherita Liebherr, 2020
 Tarastethus Sharp, 1883
 Teraphis Laporte, 1867
 Theprisa B.Moore, 1963
 Trephisa B.Moore, 1963
 Trichamblytelus Baehr, 2004
 Trichopsida Larochelle & Larivière, 2013
 Tropopterus Solier, 1849
Tribe Psydrini LeConte, 1853
 Laccocenus Sloane, 1890
 Nomius Laporte, 1835
 Psydrus LeConte, 1846

References

 
Carabidae subfamilies